Glenn Michael  Hughes (July 18, 1950 – March 4, 2001) was an American singer who was the original "Leatherman" character in the disco group Village People from 1977 to 1996.

Biography 
He graduated in 1968 from Chaminade High School, and then attended Manhattan College, where he was initiated as a member of Phi Mu Alpha Sinfonia music fraternity in 1969. He was interested in motorcycles, and was working as a toll collector at the Brooklyn-Battery Tunnel when he responded to an advertisement by composer Jacques Morali seeking "macho" singers and dancers. Hughes and other members of the band were given a crash course in the synchronized dance choreography that later typified the group's live performances.

Hughes sported an extravagant horseshoe moustache and wore his trademark leather outfit on and off stage and became one of the iconic figures of the disco era. According to Jack Fritscher, Jacques Morali drew his inspiration for the character from the gay BDSM leather bar and sex club the Mineshaft's dress code. Hughes frequented the club. He was a bike fanatic in real life and kept his motorcycle parked inside his house.

In 1996, Hughes retired from the group and launched a successful New York cabaret act until he was diagnosed with lung cancer. He had been a heavy smoker since he was a teenager. He was replaced by Eric Anzalone; however, Hughes continued with management of the band. Hughes was named on People Magazine's 1979 list of 'Most Beautiful People' and appeared in the television special The Playboy Mansion with Hugh Hefner.

Hughes died on March 4, 2001, at his Manhattan apartment from lung cancer, aged 50. He was subsequently interred wearing his leatherman outfit at Saint Charles Cemetery in Farmingdale, New York.

References

External links 

Official Village People site

1950 births
2001 deaths
20th-century American singers
American male pop singers
Burials at Saint Charles Cemetery
Chaminade High School alumni
Deaths from lung cancer in New York (state)
Manhattan College alumni
Singers from New York (state)
Village People members
20th-century American male singers
20th-century American LGBT people
1951 births